Eduard Luts (1899 Karula Parish (now Viljandi Parish), Kreis Fellin – 21 December 1942 near Velikiye Luki, Russian SFSR) was an Estonian politician. He was a member of II Riigikogu. He was a member of the Riigikogu since 22 March 1924. He replaced Georg Abels. On 22 November 1924, he resigned his position and he was replaced by Aleksander Metusala.

References

1899 births
1942 deaths
People from Viljandi Parish
People from Kreis Fellin
Workers' United Front politicians
Members of the Riigikogu, 1923–1926
Soviet military personnel killed in World War II